Jamaicans are the citizens of Jamaica and their descendants in the Jamaican diaspora. The vast majority of Jamaicans are of Sub-Saharan African descent, with minorities of Europeans, East Indians, Chinese, Middle Eastern, and others of mixed ancestry. The bulk of the Jamaican diaspora resides in other Anglophone countries, namely Canada, the United States and the United Kingdom. Jamaican populations are also prominent in other Caribbean countries, territories and Commonwealth realms, where in the Cayman Islands, Jamaican born residents make up 24.8% of the population.
Outside of Anglophone countries, the largest Jamaican diaspora community lives in Costa Rica, where Jamaicans make up a significant percentage of the population.

History

Census
According to the official Jamaica Population Census of 1970, ethnic origins categories in Jamaica include: Black (Mixed); Chinese;  East Indian; White; and 'Other' (e.g.: Syrian or Lebanese).
Jamaicans of African descent made up 92% of the working population. Those of non-African descent or mixed race made up the remaining 8% of the population.

Self-identified ethnic origin
Responses of the 2011 official census.

Religion

Diaspora

Many Jamaicans now live overseas and outside Jamaica, while many have migrated to Anglophone countries, including over 400,000 Jamaicans in the United Kingdom, over 300,000 in Canada and 1,100,000 in the United States.

There are about 30,500 Jamaicans residing in other CARICOM member including the Bahamas (5,600), Cuba (5,000), Antigua & Barbuda (12,000), Barbados and Trinidad & Tobago. There are also communities of Jamaican descendants in Central America, particularly Costa Rica, Nicaragua, and Panama. Most of Costa Rica's Afro-Costa Rican and Mulatto population, which combined represents about 7% of the total population, is of Jamaican descent.

Notable Jamaicans

See also

 Afro-Nicaraguan
 Afro-Panamanian
 Demographics of Jamaica
 Jamaicans in Ethiopia
 Taíno

References

 
Ethnic groups in Jamaica